Walid Soliman may refer to:
Walid Soliman (footballer), Egyptian footballer
Walid Soliman (writer), Tunisian writer